Jacintha Laura May Buddicom (10 May 1901 – 4 November 1993) was an English poet and a childhood friend of George Orwell (Eric Blair). She met Blair in 1914 and they developed a shared interest in poetry, but she lost touch with him after he departed for Burma in 1922, and later she disputed Blair's writings about his own childhood. The two were in contact again near the end of Blair's life. She gave an account of the relationship in her memoir Eric & Us, published in 1974.

Biography

Relationship with Eric Blair
Buddicom was born in Plymouth to Robert Arthur Buddicom, of Ticklerton Court, Church Stretton, Shropshire, Buddicom moved with the rest of her family to Shiplake, Oxfordshire where she first met Eric Blair in the summer of 1914 when he was standing on his head in a field at the bottom of the Buddicoms' garden. When asked why, he replied, "You are noticed more if you stand on your head than if you are the right way up."

From that summer afternoon, Eric and his younger sister Avril became very close friends with Buddicom and her younger brother and sister, Prosper (Robert Prosper Gedye Buddicom, 1904–1968) and Guinever (Guinever Laura Olivia Norsworthy Buddicom; 3 February 1907 - 4 February 2002). With Prosper and Guiny, Blair enjoyed shooting, fishing and birdwatching, while with Jacintha he preferred to read and write poetry and dream of future intellectual adventures. At this time he told Buddicom that at some point he might write a book in a style similar to that of H. G. Wells's A Modern Utopia, although Nineteen Eighty-Four turned out to be far different from Buddicom's expectations.

Buddicom was educated at Oxford High School, but neither she nor Blair achieved their shared dream of going to Oxford University. The couple lost touch shortly after Blair went to Burma. She became unsympathetic at the letters he wrote complaining about his life, and stopped writing back. The reason for this is explained in the Postscript edition [2006] of Eric & Us, which suggests that the then eighteen-year-old Blair may have attempted a botched seduction involving Buddicom shortly before his departure to Burma.

In 1927, Buddicom gave birth to a daughter as a result of an unsuccessful affair, and gave the baby away for a childless aunt to adopt. When Blair, who never knew of Buddicom's daughter, came back from Burma on leave that year, he assumed that she was away from the Buddicom family home because she was angry with him and they did not make contact again. She then began a 30-year affair with a peer of the Realm.

It was not until 1949, a few months before Orwell's death, that Buddicom realised that George Orwell, the author of Animal Farm, was her childhood friend Eric Blair. They exchanged a few letters and phone conversations and he was eager for her to come and see him, "to talk about my little son Richard", but it was too late by then, and a few months later, after her mother's death, she slipped unnoticed into Orwell's funeral service at Christ Church, Albany Street, in 1950.

Buddicom was at great pains to dispute the picture of childhood misery described by Orwell in his essay "Such, Such Were the Joys". She claimed that "he was a specially happy child", writing "There was no harping on inferiority and poverty by Eric then.... The picture painted of a wretched little neurotic, snivelling miserably before a swarm of swanking bullies, suspecting that he smelt, just was not Eric at all." And she made a systematic investigation of many of his claims and allegations in order to disprove them.  She described him as an aloof and undemonstrative boy, and recalled him as being self-sufficient with no need of a wide circle of friends.

After her death, her cousin Dione Venables, who was left the copyrights for the book and a quantity of family papers, did much in-depth research, and in 2006  published an updated version of Eric & Us, including all the previously unknown material about Blair's and Buddicom's relationship in a most revealing postscript.

Poetry and other activities
Buddicom lived with her sister for many years. She designed two Shropshire houses, and two motor-caravans for which she won prizes. She wrote a book of poetry published in America, and her Cat Poems were published in 1972, two years before Eric & Us appeared.

Publications
Cat Poems Leslie Frewin, 1972
Eric & Us Leslie Frewin, London, 1974
The Young Eric in Miriam Gross (ed.) The World of George Orwell Weidenfeld & Nicolson, 1971
The compleat workes of Cini Willoughby Dering, New York : Payson & Clarke, 1929

References

Further reading
Peter Burness-Smith, The Henley Standard 4 October 2006
Jack Grimston, The Sunday Times 4 February 2007.
Gordon Bowker, The Times Literary Supplement, 23 February 2007
Gerald Isaaman, The Camden New Journal, 26 April 2007.
Ferial Evans, Images Magazine, November 2007.

1901 births
1993 deaths
English women poets
Writers from Oxfordshire
People educated at Oxford High School, England
George Orwell
20th-century English women writers
20th-century English poets